In number theory, the harmonic numbers are the sums of the inverses of integers, forming the harmonic series.  Harmonic number may also refer to:

 Harmonic, a periodic wave with a frequency that is an integral multiple of the frequency of another wave
 Harmonic divisor numbers, also called Ore numbers or Ore's harmonic numbers, positive integers whose divisors have an integral harmonic mean
 3-smooth numbers, numbers whose only prime factors are 2 and 3